Toni Aubin ( Maria Antoinette Rubio; 22 September 1927 – 10 February 1990) was an American jazz vocalist who sang with big bands in the 1940s.

Career 
Aubin is most known as a featured singer with Earle Spencer and His Orchestra, with whom she began performing in 1949.  Before that, from about 1946 to about 1947, she toured with the Louis Ohls Orchestra out of Arkadelphia.

In 1947, Aubin, while singing with the Louis Ohls Orchestra, shared a featured billing with Art Pepper, who, at the time, was arranger and saxophonist with the orchestra.  Aubin had also sang with the Phil Carreon Big Band out of Los Angeles.

Pseudonym 
Her stage name is that of the French composer Tony Aubin.

Family 
Both of Aubin's parents – Mike Rubio (né Miguel Rubio Peña; 1882–1933) and Frances Espinosa Rubio (1891–1985) – were born in the Andalusia region of southern Spain and immigrated to the United States in 1913. Aubin (Maria Antoinette Rubio) was married from 1947 to 1949 to Howard Ansley Phillips (1929–2010), who played baritone saxophone Louis Ohls from about 1947 to about 1949, then with the Spencer Orchestra in 1949.  She gave birth to a girl in 1951, but gave her up for adoption (identity and whereabouts unknown).  She also had a son, Ian Charles Phillips (born 30 Sep 1949 Pasadena, California), whom she raised.

In 1954, she married Jack Stanley Lanning (1923–2000), they had 4 more children, 2 sons and 2 daughters. They remained married until her death.

Discography

Notes and references

Notes

References 

1927 births
1990 deaths
Singers from California
Big band singers
American women jazz singers
American jazz singers
20th-century American singers
20th-century American women singers
Jazz musicians from California
Earle Spencer Orchestra members